Chavicine is an alkaloid found in black pepper and other species of the genus Piper. It is one of the four geometric isomers of piperine.

See also 
 Guineesine

References 

Benzodioxoles
Piperidine alkaloids
Carboxamides
Alkene derivatives